Sergio "Serge" de la Rama Osmeña III (born December 13, 1943) is a Filipino politician and legislator who served as a Senator of the Philippines. He is a grandson of the 4th president of the Philippines, Sergio Osmeña. In his eighteen years in the Senate, Osmeña chaired the most committees and filed the most bills in the history of the institution.

Early life

Osmeña was born  in Manila to Sergio "Serging" Osmeña, Jr. of Cebu and Lourdes de la Rama of Negros Occidental. He finished his elementary studies at De La Salle College, Manila. 

He spent his secondary studies at the St. Clement's College in Iloilo City, Ateneo de Manila and Beaumont College in Berkshire, England. Although he has never obtained a university degree, he studied in various educational institutions which include University of San Carlos, University of the Philippines, Los Baños, Harvard University, and Georgetown University.

Prior to the declaration of Martial Law in the Philippines, Osmeña held business positions including:
Assistant to president, Essel Incorporated (1967 to 1972)
Assistant to president, Cebu Autobus Company (1967 to 1972)
Assistant to president, De La Rama Steamship Co., Inc. (1966 to 1972)
General Manager, LRO (Lourdes de la Rama Osmeña) Farms / Hacienda Doña Pepang (1968 to 1972)
Chairman, Cebu Contracting Company (1968 to 1972)

As a son of Marcos' political rival, Osmeña was imprisoned in 1972. In November 1974, he embarked on a hunger strike along with his cellmate, Eugenio "Geny" Lopez, Jr., to protest the unjust detention of thousands of innocent Filipinos. This resulted in the release of 1,022 political prisoners in December 1974. Osmeña and Lopez escaped from their maximum security prison cell in Fort Bonifacio on September 30, 1977. This exploit was enacted in the 1995 movie, Eskapo.

While in exile at the United States, Osmeña served as the Director for Movement for a Free Philippines. He was also the founding director of the Justice for Aquino Justice for All (JAJA) Movement.

After the removal of Marcos, Osmeña returned to the Philippines and held positions in business and government corporations in the 1990s:
Director, Pacific CATV, Incorporated (1994 to 1995)
Director, Telecommunications Holdings Corporation (1994 to 1995)
Chairman, Intervest Group (1994 to 1995)
Director, Micrologic Systems, Inc. (1994 to 1995)
Director, Philippine National Bank (1992 to 1995)
Director, San Miguel Corporation (1993 to 1995)

Political career

He served as Secretary General of the Progressive Party cluster NUCD-UMDP from 1991 to 1992. When it merged with Lakas Tao in 1992, he served as the member of the National Directorate. In 1992, Osmena ran for Congressman in Cebu's Sixth District but lost.

In 1995, Osmeña was invited by President Fidel Ramos to join
in the senatorial race under the Lakas-Laban ticket. He won in the elections and served his term as senator from 1995 to 2001. During that term he was asked to look for a new site of the Senate after the old Executive Building will be renovated for the National Museum. The Senate offices and session hall were transferred to the GSIS Building at the Financial Center in Pasay.

In 1997, Osmeña bolted Lakas NUCD to be an independent senator. In 1998, he joined the Liberal Party. Osmeña succeeded Senator Edgardo J. Angara as Chair of the powerful Committee on Agriculture and Food and the Congressional Oversight Committee on Agricultural and Fisheries Modernization (COCAFM). 

As Chair, Osmeña tried to block the approval of the construction of the Casecnan and the San Roque dams having discovered gross discrepancies in the costs and benefits of the projects. It was Osmeña who pointed out that the government would be investing a ridiculous amount of more than P385,000 to irrigate an additional hectare of rice paddy. The expose led to the cancellation of the proposed Balog-Balog irrigation project.

In 2001, Osmeña was one of the senators who voted in favor of opening the second bank envelope for the impeachment case filed against Joseph Estrada. The motion was outnumbered, and it led to the second EDSA People Power Revolution. He ran as independent for the position of Senator under the People Power Coalition. He won in the elections and served his second term as senator from 2001 to 2007. 

Right after Senator Aquilino Pimentel Jr. was replaced by Senator Franklin Drilon as Senate President, he joined Pimentel's party PDP–Laban. His mandate as senator for the second term expired in 2007.

Running independent again in 2010 (although adopted by the Liberal Party and the Partido ng Masang Pilipino), Osmeña refused to participate in the sorties of his adoptive parties and opted instead  to campaign all by himself. He graced radio programs and television interviews. 

Running on a shoe-string budget, Osmeña did not have the volume of posters and billboards of his opponents. He had television advertisements that to him would be more effective and more prudent to reach the electorate. Osmeña placed tenth and became a senator again for the third time.

He ran again in 2016 & 2019 as an independent but failed to make a Senate comeback losing in both elections.

Personal life

He is married to Bettina Lopez (daughter of former Congressman Alberto Lopez of Iloilo and Chona Mejia Lopez). He has six children.

Serge Osmeña came from a family of senators. His grandfather Sergio Sr. served during the American colonial period. His father Sergio Jr. served in the 1960s. His cousin, John Henry served in the Senate from 1971 to 1972, 1987–1992, 1992–1995 and 1998–2004. His maternal grandfather, Esteban de la Rama of Negros Occidental was also a senator.

His nephew, John Gregory,served as Provincial Vice Governor of Cebu and his younger brother Tomas III is the Congressman of Cebu City's south district. Tommy was a close ally of President Gloria Macapagal Arroyo.

He was bestowed Doctor of Laws – Honoris Causa, by the Benguet State University in 2000.

He is the chairman of the Aquaworld Corporation, which he held since 1992. While serving his initial term as senator he held a concurrent position as board director of San Miguel Brewery (HK), Ltd.

He was a member of the Philippine Jaycees, where he served as a senator in 1994. He founded Pundok Sugbuanon while he lived in Los Angeles from 1990 to 1992. He is one of the Directors of the ABS-CBN Bayan Microfinance Foundation, held since 1999, and the Lorenzo Tañada Foundation, held since 1998.

Other
Serge Osmeña is a farmer and businessman by training and was educated at Harvard, Georgetown, and the University of the Philippines.

Raised a Visayan, Osmeña speaks Cebuano and Hiligaynon as mother languages although his first language is Tagalog.

In popular culture
Osmeña was portrayed by Richard Gomez in the 1995 film Eskapo.

References

1943 births
Senators of the 16th Congress of the Philippines
Senators of the 15th Congress of the Philippines
Senators of the 13th Congress of the Philippines
Senators of the 12th Congress of the Philippines
Senators of the 11th Congress of the Philippines
Senators of the 10th Congress of the Philippines
University of the Philippines Los Baños alumni
People from Manila
People from Cebu City
Sergio Osmena III
People from Negros Occidental
Living people
Cebuano people
Visayan people
Filipino Roman Catholics
Lakas–CMD (1991) politicians
Liberal Party (Philippines) politicians
PDP–Laban politicians
Progressive Party (Philippines) politicians
University of San Carlos alumni
Independent politicians in the Philippines
Candidates in the 1998 Philippine vice-presidential election
Harvard University alumni
Marcos martial law victims
Georgetown University alumni